Ruan Qilong (born 2 January 2001) is a Chinese footballer currently playing as a defender for Beijing Guoan.

Club career
Ruan Qilong would play for the Fujian Football Association youth team initially as a goalkeeper before being transformed into a defender and attracting the attentions of the Chinese U18 team. On 9 March 2019 he moved to his boyhood supported football club Beijing Guoan, where he would play for their youth team. To gain more playing time he would be loaned out to the China U19 team who were allowed to take part in the third tier of the Chinese pyramid. 

On his return in June 2021, despite not having registered a single league appearance with the Beijing's first team, he would be given an opportunity to participate within senior games when he was part of the AFC Champions League squad, which was a mix of reserves and youth players to participate within centralized venues while the clubs senior players were still dealing with self-isolating measures due to COVID-19. He would make his continental debut in a AFC Champions League game on 26 June 2021 against United City F.C. in a 1-1 draw. 

After his return from the continental competition he would go on to make his league debut on 29 December 2021 against Shandong Taishan F.C. in a 1-1 draw. The following season would see him score his first goals for the club in a league game against Hebei F.C. on 10 December 2022 in a 4-0 victory.

Career statistics
.

References

External links

2001 births
Living people
Chinese footballers
China youth international footballers
Association football defenders
Beijing Guoan F.C. players